Seif Eissa (Arabic: سيف عيسى; born 15 June 1998) is an Egyptian Taekwondo practitioner & a Bronze medalist at the 2020 Summer Olympics. He won a bronze medal at the 2014 Summer Youth Olympics in Nanjing, China. He also earned a gold medal at the 2015 African Games in Gaborone.

In 2020, he competed in the men's 80 kg event at the 2020 African Taekwondo Olympic Qualification Tournament in Rabat, Morocco and he qualified to represent Egypt at the 2020 Summer Olympics in Tokyo, Japan.

At the 2021 African Taekwondo Championships held in Dakar, Senegal, he won the gold medal in the men's 80 kg event. A few months later, at the 2020 Summer Olympics, he won one of the bronze medals in the 80 kg event.

He won the gold medal in the men's 80 kg event at the 2022 Mediterranean Games held in Oran, Algeria.

References

External links
 

1998 births
Living people
Egyptian male taekwondo practitioners
Taekwondo practitioners at the 2014 Summer Youth Olympics
African Games silver medalists for Egypt
African Games medalists in taekwondo
Mediterranean Games gold medalists for Egypt
Mediterranean Games silver medalists for Egypt
Mediterranean Games medalists in taekwondo
Competitors at the 2015 African Games
Competitors at the 2018 Mediterranean Games
Competitors at the 2022 Mediterranean Games
Competitors at the 2019 African Games
Medalists at the 2019 Summer Universiade
African Taekwondo Championships medalists
Universiade medalists in taekwondo
Universiade medalists for Egypt
Taekwondo practitioners at the 2020 Summer Olympics
Olympic bronze medalists for Egypt
Medalists at the 2020 Summer Olympics
Olympic medalists in taekwondo
21st-century Egyptian people
Olympic taekwondo practitioners of Egypt
World Taekwondo Championships medalists